Charlie Janssen (born January 15, 1971) is an American politician from the U.S. state of Nebraska.  A member of the Republican Party, Jansen served in the Nebraska Legislature from 2009 to 2014; in 2014, he was elected Nebraska Auditor of Public Accounts.

Janssen was born in Fremont, Nebraska. He graduated with a BS from Wayne State College in 1997. Janssen served in the United States Navy from 1989 to 1993.  He lives in Fremont, and has two children, Charlie Jr. and Betsy Anne.

Janssen served on the Fremont City Council before being elected to the Nebraska legislature. In 2008, he was elected to represent the 15th Nebraska legislative district replacing his uncle, Ray Janssen of Nickerson. In the Legislature, he sat on the Government, Military and Veterans Affairs, Intergovernmental Cooperation, and Transportation and Telecommunications committees. He briefly proposed an amendment to LB403 (a bill mandating the use of E-Verify for public employers, public contractors and companies seeking state tax breaks) which would have overturned the Dream Act of 2006 in Nebraska, however he later withdrew his amendment.

Janssen successfully ran as the Republican nominee for Nebraska Auditor of Public Accounts in the 2014 election to succeed Mike Foley and was sworn in on January 8, 2015, and was succeeded by Mike Foley (Nebraska politician) in 2023.

Janssen was reelected in 2018 amidst controversy involving being discovered drinking at local bars for hours at a time during workdays on multiple occasions.

References

External links
 Charlie Janssen's campaign website
 Project Vote Smart: Senator Charlie Janssen's Biography

|-

1971 births
21st-century American politicians
Living people
Nebraska Auditors of Public Accounts
Nebraska city council members
Republican Party Nebraska state senators
People from Fremont, Nebraska
Wayne State College alumni